The Germans of Serbia are an ethnic minority of Serbia which numbers 4,064 people according to last population census from 2011. The Germans of Serbia usually refer to themselves as Swabian (Schwaben, Švabe), and they are grouped into the Danube Swabians or Banat Swabians in the Vojvodina region, where the majority of the population resides. Germans settled parts of Serbia in the late 17th century during Habsburg administration. The German population of Vojvodina was more numerous in the past (about 350,000 before World War II).

More than 250,000 left during the withdrawal of Nazi forces. As a consequence of the World War II events in Yugoslavia, the Yugoslav Communist government took a reprisals on ethnic citizens of German origin in Yugoslavia (including Vojvodina): they had their citizenship revoked and their belongings and houses were nationalized and taken from them. Between 1944 and 1946, a prison camp system was established for Yugoslav citizens of German origin, usually in settlements where they lived. After prison camps were abolished, ethnic Germans of Yugoslavia regained their rights and citizenship and most of them emigrated to Germany or Austria in the following years because of economic reasons.

History

Germans started to settle in the territory of present-day Serbia in the end of the 17th century, when Habsburg monarchy took parts of these areas from the Ottoman Empire. During Habsburg rule, Germans were privileged nationality in the Monarchy and German language was a lingua franca of the country, used by members of other ethnicities as well. After the Austro-Hungarian compromise from 1867, present-day northern Serbia was included into the Hungarian part of the Dual Monarchy and Hungarian language replaced German as a main language of administration and inter-ethnic communication.

In 1918, following the dissolution of Austria-Hungary, a short-lived Banat Republic was proclaimed in Banat region, mainly as an initiative of local Germans. Soon, the territory of this republic was divided between the newly formed Kingdom of Serbs, Croats and Slovenes and the Kingdom of Romania. In 1929, regions of present-day Serbia that had sizable German population (Banat, Bačka, Syrmia) were included into the newly formed Danube Banovina province.

In the interwar period, Germans were one of the largest national minorities on the territory of present-day Serbia, second only to the Hungarians. According to 1931 census, Germans formed the largest part of population in the districts ("srez") of Bačka Palanka, Odžaci, Kula, Apatin, and Sombor. They also formed the largest part of population in several important cities and towns such are Vršac, Ruma, Bačka Palanka, Inđija, Vrbas, Futog, Apatin, Nova Pazova, Bela Crkva, Crvenka, Odžaci, Bački Jarak, Bač, Banatski Karlovac, Plandište, Žitište, Jaša Tomić, Sečanj, etc., as well as in one number of other settlements.

During the Axis occupation of Yugoslavia, from 1941 to 1944, Banat was an autonomous German-administered region within occupied Serbia. The 7th SS Volunteer Mountain Division Prinz Eugen formed in 1941 from Volksdeutsche (ethnic German) volunteers from the Banat was a German mountain infantry division of the Waffen-SS, the armed wing of the German Nazi Party. The notorious SS Division committed massive war crimes against the Serbian civilian population. In 1943 Heinrich Himmler introduced compulsory military service for ethnic Germans in Serbia. The German military defeat in World War II resulted in flight or imprisonment of the almost entire German community (which numbered about 350,000) in Serbia's territory. It is estimated that about 200,000 Germans were evacuated during the flight of the German army from Serbian territory, while about 140,000 who remained in the country were sent to prison camps run by the new communist authorities. After prison camps were dissolved (in 1948), most of the remaining German population left Serbia because of economic reasons.

In 2007, the minority formed a national council for the first time since the Second World War. In the 2000s several monuments to the pre-war German population have been erected. In 2008 the Association of Danube Swabians requested that the government of the city of Sremska Mitrovica exhume the bodies of Germans who died in a post-war camp in the town.

Demographics
Most of the Germans (3,272) are living in the autonomous Vojvodina region, with sizable number (498) also in Belgrade region.

Notable people

Ivan Bek
Lujza Mišić
Ignjat Sopron
Đorđe Vajfert
Helmar Müller, West German olympic track and field athlete
Anna Stein, West German olympic artistic gymnast

See also

Germany-Serbia relations
Serbs in Germany
German exonyms (Vojvodina)

References

Literature
 
 Nenad Stefanović, Jedan svet na Dunavu, Beograd, 2003.
 Dr Anđelija Ivkov, Demografska slika Vojvodine, Beograd, 2006.

 Dragomir Jankov, Vojvodina - propadanje jednog regiona, Novi Sad, 2004.

Further reading

Krel, A., 2012. Sprechen sie deutsch? German language and revitalization of ethnic identity of the Germans in Bačka. Glasnik Etnografskog instituta SANU, 60(2), pp. 171–185.

External links
 Official Website by the Germans of Serbia: Nacionalni savet nemačke nacionalne manjine

Serbia
Ethnic groups in Serbia
Ethnic groups in Vojvodina
Serbian people of German descent